Lisa Mosconi is an Italian American neuroscientist, educator, and author known for her books The XX Brain and Brain Food. She is the  Director of the Women’s Brain Initiative and Director of the Alzheimer’s Prevention Clinic, both at Weill Cornell Medical College where she is an Associate Professor of Neuroscience in Neurology.

Early life and education
Mosconi was born in Italy and both of her parents are nuclear physicists. There is a history of Alzheimer's disease in her family which affected her grandmother and her grandmother's two sisters. She received a five-year university degree in Experimental Psychology and Ph.D. in Neuroscience and Nuclear Medicine from the University of Florence, in collaboration with New York University School of Medicine. She moved to the United States when she was 24.

Research
Her research focuses on the early detection of Alzheimer’s disease in at-risk individuals, women in particular. This is the topic of her book The XX Brain where she explains that menopause is a neurological as well as hormonal process; she believes in reframing brain health as a vital, yet overlooked component of women’s health. Her research has shown that women with a specific genetic risk factor for Alzheimer’s disease developed amyloid plaques, linked to the disease, during perimenopause, a time earlier than previously thought. This research changes the treatment and intervention window for health care professionals trying to prevent Alzheimer’s and chronic diseases that affect people in older age. She is funded partially via a five-year grant from the NIH to study Alzheimer’s and women’s brains. She is a member of the AARP brain health council and is on the Aspen Brain Institute Scientific Advisory Council.

Mosconi's TED Talk on how menopause affects the brain has been viewed over four million times. Her book The XX Brain was a New York Times bestseller. Her book Brain Food discusses which foods are more beneficial for brain health and looks at research which shows that a poor diet and a lack of hydration can be damaging to the brain especially as it gets older.

References

External links
 Official website
 The XX Brain official site

Living people
American neuroscientists
21st-century women scientists
American women neuroscientists
American women academics
21st-century American women
Alzheimer's disease researchers
Year of birth missing (living people)
Weill Medical College of Cornell University faculty